Perfect Symmetry is the third studio album by English rock band Keane, released on 13 October 2008 in the United Kingdom.

Cover
The cover for the album was revealed on 5 September. Tim Rice-Oxley explained that the imagery of the band are photographs of bigger than life-size sculptures of the band members, made by Korean artist Osang Gwon. It was implied that these sculptures will form the basis of the album's image and promotion up to the date of release.

Track listing

Notes
(^) denotes additional production
(*) denotes co-producer

Bonus DVD
 Making of Perfect Symmetry documentary
 Track by track commentary
 "Spiralling" (live rehearsal)
 "Spiralling" (demo)
 "The Lovers Are Losing" (demo)
 "Better Than This" (demo)
 "You Haven't Told Me Anything" (demo)
 "Perfect Symmetry" (demo)
 "You Don't See Me" (demo)
 "Again and Again" (demo)
 "Playing Along" (demo)
 "Pretend That You're Alone" (demo)
 "Black Burning Heart" (demo)
 "Love Is the End" (demo)

In culture
The album's eleventh song "Love Is the End" was featured on the 18th episode from the sixth season of the series One Tree Hill.

Perfect Symmetry World Tour
The Perfect Symmetry World Tour started 29 September 2008 and finished 29 October 2009, with 121 shows.  During the Perfect Symmetry album release week, the band did some free shows in the UK.

Personnel

Keane
Tom Chaplin – vocals, guitar
Tim Rice-Oxley – piano, keyboards, guitar, percussion, synthesizers, composition, backing vocals
Richard Hughes – drums, percussion, backing vocals

Additional personnel
Jesse Quin – bass, guitar (on "Black Burning Heart"), percussion, backing vocals
Stephen Hussey – violin (on "Love Is the End")
Chris Fish – cello (on "Love Is the End")
Jo Silverston; Ian Harris – musical saw (on "Love Is the End")
Jim Hunt – saxophone (on "Pretend That You're Alone")
Anaël Train – French vocal (on "Black Burning Heart")
Jake Davies – engineering
Mark "Spike" Stent – mixing and additional production
Stuart Price – co-production (for "Again and Again" and "Black Burning Heart")
Jon Brion – additional production (for "You Haven't Told Me Anything")
Scott Johnson – on Studio Tech
Stephen Marcussen – mastering
Beth Louise Warren – band assistance and recording co-ordinator
Osang Gwon – sculptures for booklet
Rob Chenery at Tourist – design and art direction
Shamil Tanna – photography
Adam Tudhope – managing

Charts

Weekly charts

Year-end charts

Certifications and sales

See also
List of songs by Keane

References

External links
The UrbanWire's review of Perfect Symmetry
Perfect Symmetry at Keaneshaped
Keane Live In Hong-Kong

2008 albums
Island Records albums
Keane (band) albums